Sally Mackereth (born 10 February 1966) is a British architect practising in London. After graduating from the Architectural Association in 1995, Mackereth co-founded Wells Mackereth before creating Studio Mackereth in 2013, which the Telegraph has called one of the best practices in London. Having taught as a senior lecturer at the Royal College of Art from 1997 to 2001, in 2019, Mackereth embarked on a PhD at RMIT researching her design approach alongside running Studio Mackereth. In 2020, Mackereth was invited to head the judging panel for the architecture categories of the Dezeen awards alongside Norman Foster. World Architecture News nominated Mackereth as a finalist for the Female Frontier award in 2021. 

Mackereth’s work includes a conversion of a Victorian stables in King's Cross, London, a renovation of Winterton Lighthouse, and a new-build gallery in the heart of Mayfair. She has also contributed to media channels including the BBC Radio 4’s Woman's Hour and Channel 4 discussing architecture and her practice. She has also been involved in redesigning retail spaces for brands including Royal Salute, Bumble & Bumble, and Pringle of Scotland.

References

Further reading
 

 
  Retrieved 28 February 2022

British architects
British women architects
1966 births
Living people